Klyuchevsky (masculine), Klyuchevskaya (feminine), or Klyuchevskoye (neuter) is the name of several inhabited localities in Russia:

Urban localities
Klyuchevsky, Zabaykalsky Krai, an urban-type settlement in Mogochinsky District of Zabaykalsky Krai

Rural localities
Klyuchevsky, Kirov Oblast, a pochinok in Shabalinsky District of Kirov Oblast
Klyuchevskaya (rural locality), a village in Afanasyevsky District of Kirov Oblast
Klyuchevskoye, name of several rural localities